Pipa aspera, the Albina Surinam toad, is a species of frog in the family Pipidae found in French Guiana, Suriname, and possibly Brazil.  Its natural habitats are subtropical or tropical moist lowland forests, rivers, freshwater marshes, and intermittent freshwater marshes. The color of this species is a reddish-brown to a brownish-black, noticed on the dorsal part of its body. The weights of females range between 5 and 12 grams, and males between 4 and 7 grams, noting that females are usually significantly larger.

References

aspera
Taxonomy articles created by Polbot
Amphibians described in 1924
Taxa named by Lorenz Müller